The Sand Hills Historic District in Augusta, Georgia is a historic district which was listed on the National Register of Historic Places in 1997.  The district included 334 contributing buildings and a contributing site in a  area roughly bounded by Monte Sano and North View Aves., Mount Auburn St., Johns Rd., and the Augusta Country Club.

It is also known as Elizabethtown Historic District.

The district "is a historic African-American neighborhood located in the western part of Augusta adjacent to the
National Register-listed Summerville Historic District. The neighborhood is laid out in an incomplete grid pattern and consists of a historic African-American cemetery, residential buildings, commercial buildings, community landmark buildings, and landscaped yards and median of a road. The neighborhood's development is closely associated with the development of the Summerville neighborhood. The Sand Hills Historic District has statewide significance in the areas of Architecture, Ethnic Heritage: African American, Community Planning and Development, and Landscape Architecture."

It is roughly bounded by Monte Sano Ave., North View Avenue, Mount Auburn Street, Johns Road, and the Augusta Country Club.

It borders on the Augusta Country Club, which itself borders on the Augusta National Golf Club.

See also
Sand Hills region of Georgia and the Carolinas
Sand Hills cottage architecture

References

National Register of Historic Places in Richmond County, Georgia
Historic districts on the National Register of Historic Places in Georgia (U.S. state)
Colonial Revival architecture in Georgia (U.S. state)
Tudor Revival architecture in the United States
Mission Revival architecture in Georgia (U.S. state)
Buildings and structures completed in 1874